Oenonidae is a family of polychaetes belonging to the order Eunicida.

Genera

Genera:
 Aenone Lamarck, 1818
 Aenone Risso, 1826
 Aglaura Savigny, 1818

References

Polychaetes